Crispín Castro Monroy (born 18 August 1936) was the municipal president of Santa Cruz Atizapán in the State of Mexico, from January 1970 to January 1972. While in office he made changes to help the town and citizens. He was a member of the Institutional Revolutionary Party (PRI).

In 1955 he had left Santa Cruz Atizapán to work in Anaheim, California. He returned to Mexico to serve as municipal president.

Monroy now lives in La Puente, California.

References

Municipal presidents in the State of Mexico
Politicians from the State of Mexico
1936 births
Living people
Institutional Revolutionary Party politicians
People from La Puente, California
20th-century Mexican politicians
Mexican emigrants to the United States